Hans Andries de Boer (born 30 May 1937) is a former Dutch politician of the defunct Anti-Revolutionary Party (ARP) and later the Christian Democratic Appeal (CDA) party and trade association executive.

De Boer attended a Lyceum in Velsen from May 1949 until June 1955. De Boer worked as a farmworker in Velsen from May 1953 until July 1960. De Boer worked as a trade association executive for the Christian Farmers and Gardeners association (CBTB) from July 1960 until February 1972 and served as General-Secretary from August 1970 until February 1972. De Boer served on the Provincial-Council of North Holland from June 1966 until February 1972 and served on the Municipal Council in Velsen from April 1971 until April 1974 and served as an Alderman in Velsen from September 1971 until September 1973.

De Boer became a Member of the House of Representatives after resignation of Joop Bakker, taking office on 16 February 1972 serving as a frontbencher chairing the special parliamentary committee for Gambling Reforms and the special parliamentary committee for Fishing Zones Establishments and spokesperson for Small business, Civil Service, Fisheries, Culture, Media and Military Personnel. De Boer also Chairman of the Anti-Revolutionary Party from 13 December 1975 until 27 September 1980. After the election of 1977 the Christian Democratic Appeal and the People's Party for Freedom and Democracy (VVD) formed the Cabinet Van Agt-Wiegel, De Boer and several Christian Democratic Appeal Members of the House of Representatives were critical on the coalition agreement and formed an informal caucus in their own parliamentary group called the Loyalists that supported the cabinet only with confidence and supply. After the election of 1981 De Boer was appointed as State Secretary for Culture, Recreation and Social Work the Cabinet Van Agt II, taking office on 11 September 1981. The Cabinet Van Agt II fell just seven months into its term on 12 May 1982 after months of tensions in the coalition and continued to serve in a demissionary until the first cabinet formation of 1982 when it was replaced by the caretaker Cabinet Van Agt III with De Boer appointed as Minister of Culture, Recreation and Social Work, taking office on 29 May 1982. After the election of 1982 De Boer returned as a Member of the House of Representatives, taking office on 16 September 1982. De Boer took a medical leave of absence on 11 October 1982 after which Minister of Health and Environment Til Gardeniers-Berendsen served as acting Minister of Culture, Recreation and Social Work. Following the second cabinet formation of 1982 De Boer was not giving a cabinet post in the new cabinet, the Cabinet Van Agt III was replaced by the Cabinet Lubbers I on 4 November 1982 and he continued to serve in the House of Representatives as a frontbencher and spokesperson for Welfare, Sport, Social Work and Culture.

In February 1983 De Boer was nominated as Mayor of Haarlemmermeer, he resigned as a Member of the House of Representatives the same day he was installed as mayor, taking office on 13 March 1983. In September 1985 De Boer was appointed as Secretary-General of the Ministry of Welfare, Health and Culture, he resigned as mayor on 1 October 1985 and was installed as secretary-general, serving from 1 January 1986 until 16 October 1995. In October 1995 De Boer was nominated as chairman of the executive board of the Hospitals association (NVZ), he resigned as secretary-general the same day he was installed as chairman on 16 October 1995.

De Boer retired from active politic and became active in the private sector and public sector and occupied numerous seats as a corporate director and nonprofit director on several boards of directors and supervisory boards (Stork B.V., Stichting Pensioenfonds Zorg en Welzijn, European Cultural Foundation, Intertrust Group Transnational Institute, Max Havelaar Foundation and the World Press Photo) and served on several state commissions and councils on behalf of the government (Stichting Pensioenfonds ABP, Advisory Council for Spatial Planning, Environmental Assessment Agency and the Social and Economic Council).

Decorations

References

External links

Official
  H.A. (Hans) de Boer Parlement & Politiek

 

 
 

 

 

1937 births
Living people
Anti-Revolutionary Party politicians
Chairmen of the Anti-Revolutionary Party
Christian Democratic Appeal politicians
Dutch corporate directors
Dutch lobbyists
Dutch nonprofit directors
Dutch nonprofit executives
Dutch trade association executives
Grand Officers of the Order of Orange-Nassau
Knights of the Order of the Netherlands Lion
Mayors of Haarlemmermeer
Members of the House of Representatives (Netherlands)
Members of the Provincial Council of North Holland
Members of the Social and Economic Council
Ministers of Social Work of the Netherlands
Ministers of Sport of the Netherlands
Municipal councillors in North Holland
People from Haarlemmermeer
People from Velsen
Protestant Church Christians from the Netherlands
Reformed Churches Christians from the Netherlands
State Secretaries for Social Work of the Netherlands
20th-century Dutch businesspeople
20th-century Dutch civil servants
20th-century Dutch politicians
21st-century Dutch businesspeople